Jason Shane Ellis (born 11 October 1971) is an Australian radio personality who is best known as the host of The Jason Ellis Show on Sirius XM satellite radio, which aired from 2005 to 2020. Ellis is also a former professional skateboarder, auto racer, and singer.

Athletics and sports

Professional skateboarding
Ellis moved to the US when he was 17 to embark on a professional skateboarding career, which began in 1985. He retired from the sport in 2006. In 2001, Ellis set a Guinness World Record for the biggest drop on a skateboard, jumping into a 70-foot skateboard ramp. The record was broken by Danny Way in 2006.

One of the six Big Air competitors to compete in both 2004 and 2005, Ellis was suffering from a concussion in 2005 and didn't make the final, finishing tenth overall. Still involved in the skate community, Ellis has performed skate demos alongside Tony Hawk, is a perennial X-Games competitor in the Mega Ramp competition, and was the host of the annual 'Tony Hawk's Boom Boom Huckjam'.

Mixed martial arts
Ellis formerly trained in the Team Quest camp located in Murrieta, California under the direction of Dan Henderson, Jason "Mayhem" Miller, and Muhammed Lawal. He also trains with Justin Fortune at Fortune Boxing Gym in Hollywood California.

Ellis made his mixed martial arts debut against Brazilian jiu-jitsu specialist Tony Gianopulos on 6 February 2009 winning via guillotine choke submission.

On May 6, 2017, Ellis defeated Gabe Rivas via an Americana submission, 1 second away from the end of the 3rd round. Advancing Ellis to 2-0 in professional mixed martial arts. They fought at 190 lbs (86.2 kg) in San Jacinto, California.

Mixed martial arts record

|-
|Win
|align=center|2–0
|Gabe Rivas
|Submission (americana)
|KOTC: Ground Breaking
|
|align=center|3
|align=center|4:59
|San Jacinto, California, United States
|
|-
|Win
|align=center|1–0
|Tony Gianopulos
|Submission (guillotine choke)
|Sheckler Foundation: Down for Life – Fight for a Cause
|
|align=center|2
|align=center|2:21
|Anaheim, California, United States
|
|-

Truck racing
For the 2011 season, Ellis raced in the Lucas Oil SuperLite Series for Dethrone. At a number of events, he did his Friday morning radio show from his R.V.

Boxing
After a three-year hiatus from MMA, Ellis returned to the sport on 14 July 2012 defeating UFC veteran Gabe Ruediger via KO in the second round in a celebrity non-professional boxing fight. Gabe Ruediger has since challenged Ellis to a re-match, citing that he did not take the first fight seriously. After being dropped by Ellis, Gabe lost their rematch to a decision.

On 15 October 2016, Ellis participated in a boxing exhibition match against former UFC champion Shane Carwin at EllisMania 13. Per the unique rules, Carwin had one of his arms duct-taped to his body to box Ellis.  Ellis lost the bout via knockout in the second round.

Media

Hawk vs Wolf podcast
Ellis hosts the podcast Hawk vs Wolf with Tony Hawk.

Radio host

Ellis launched his radio career as a co-host of Hawk's Demolition Radio on a part-time basis. He soon became the host of his own show on the network.

Following his skateboarding career, Ellis became a host for the Sirius XM satellite radio station and launched The Jason Ellis Show. The show was cancelled on SiriusXM on 11-22-2020, and has since continued as a podcast.

Filmography

Music
Ellis was also the founding member and vocalist for the comedy rock/metal band, Taintstick, which achieved chart success with its debut album Six Pounds of Sound. Taintstick has since become known as "Death! Death! Die!"

Other media 
Ellis co-authored I'm Awesome: One Man's Triumphant Quest to Become the Sweetest Dude Ever in 2013, and The Awesome Guide to Life: Get Fit, Get Laid, Get Your Sh*t Together in 2014.

Personal life
From 2006 to 2012, Ellis was married to wife Andrea Brown. They had a daughter Devin and son Tiger. In August 2017, Ellis married Katie Gilbert. In December 2016, Ellis and Gilbert appeared on the This Life With Dr. Drew and Bob Forrest podcast where he spoke about his past addictions and sobriety, as well as the trauma he experienced after the death of his brother Stevie.

In 2016, Ellis announced he is bisexual. He affirmed his sexuality in 2019, stating: "Bit scared to talk about it. But I am a bi guy and I think it’s ok. Not here for a shoutout just letting others know it’s ok to be you too. I’m happy".

References

External links

RadioFaction

1971 births
Australian expatriate sportspeople in the United States
Australian male mixed martial artists
Australian practitioners of Brazilian jiu-jitsu
Australian skateboarders
Living people
Middleweight mixed martial artists
Sportspeople from Melbourne
Australian LGBT broadcasters
Australian LGBT sportspeople
Mixed martial artists utilizing Brazilian jiu-jitsu
Bisexual sportspeople
LGBT skateboarders